Babel: Or the Necessity of Violence: An Arcane History of the Oxford Translators' Revolution is a 2022 novel by R. F. Kuang. It debuted at the first spot on The New York Times Best Seller list and won Blackwell's Books of the Year for Fiction in 2022. Thematically similar to The Poppy War, Kuang's first book series, the book criticizes British imperialism, capitalism, and the complicity of academia in perpetuating and enabling them. Kuang drew heavily from history and her own experiences as both a translator and an Oxford graduate.

Setting
Babel is set in an alternate-reality 1830s England in which Britain's global economic and colonial supremacy are fueled by the use of magical silver bars. In this world, silver has magical properties tied to language: it is capable of capturing what is "lost in translation" between words in different languages that have similar, but not identical, meanings. Silver bars inscribed with such 'match-pairs' of words can thus manifest magical effects, which may increase agricultural production, improve the accuracy of bullets, heal injuries, and more. To harness the power of translation, Oxford University hosts the Royal Institute of Translation, nicknamed "Babel". At Babel, scholars work to find match-pairs between disparate languages, using their efforts to maintain Britain’s silver supremacy.

Plot 
An orphan from Canton is adopted by Richard Lovell, a Babel professor, and takes the English name Robin Swift. Lovell has Robin tutored in Latin and Greek as well as Mandarin in order to prepare him for admission to Babel. It quickly becomes apparent that Lovell is Robin’s biological father, but neither is willing to discuss this out loud. One day, Robin embarrasses Lovell by being late to one of his lessons and is brutally beaten and threatened with being returned to Canton to live in poverty. Nevertheless, Robin excels in his studies and, after seven years, is accepted into Babel.

Robin quickly befriends the other members of his first-year cohort: Ramy from Kolkata, Victoire from Haiti, and Letty, a white British admiral’s daughter. There they learn that the effectiveness of translating European languages into English is diminishing and that “exotic” languages like Mandarin, Haitian Creole, and Arabic are considered the future of translation magic. In his first week, Robin encounters Griffin, his elder half-brother—another half-Chinese son of Professor Lovell—who recruits him into the Hermes Society, a clandestine organization seeking to undermine Britain’s silver supremacy. Griffin explains to Robin how Babel exploits the languages of foreign nations only in order to solidify the British Empire's dominance over them. Robin goes along with Griffin’s plans, abetting thefts of silver bars to aid Hermes, but remains conflicted, torn between his distaste for British colonial excess and inequality and his potential comfortable future as an imperial translator. This tension leads him to eventually break contact with Griffin and Hermes in his third year at Oxford.

Robin, Ramy, Victoire, and Letty join Lovell on a trip to Canton to act as translators in the escalating conflict between the Qing Dynasty and British Empire over the Qing refusal to allow British opium exports. Robin witnesses the contempt the British have for the Chinese and, after meeting with a Canton official and witnessing an opium den firsthand, refuses to be a part of any British project there. The Qing government destroys a fortune in opium and all Babel affiliates depart back to England immediately. Lovell again browbeats Robin in a racist tirade for his supposed complicity with the Qing. However, Robin, for the first time, refuses to back down. Robin kills Lovell by using a silver bar to blow a hole in his chest. Ramy, Victoire, and Letty help Robin dispose of the body and hide their crime.

Once they return to Britain, they discover in Lovell’s effects that the negotiations in China were a sham; Lovell and others were only trying to create a pretext for war, allowing Britain to seize China's stockpiles of silver. Letty walks in on Robin, Ramy, and Victoire discussing Hermes business, but she swears to stand by them after they explain their experiences of discrimination and the scale of British imperial atrocity. The group contacts Hermes, whose members opt to lobby Parliament and whip up public opposition to war with China with a pamphlet campaign. Griffin confides in Robin that he believes only violence can bring the empire down and teaches Robin to use firearms. However, Letty betrays them and, as the police raid the Hermes headquarters, shoots and kills Ramy.

Griffin breaks Victoire and Robin out of prison, but is killed during the escape. The pair decide that only force can hope to succeed, and resolve to capture Babel’s college tower. They enter the college, recruiting a few of the students and faculty while expelling the rest. They start removing the resonance rods that allow the translation magic across Britain to function, throwing the country into disarray, and announce their intent to continue doing so until their demands for peace with China are met. They attract supporters among radicals and reformers, who fortify Oxford against the British army. After weeks of sabotage, culminating with the destruction of Westminster Bridge, Letty arrives to plead with them to surrender, promising that the army will raid the tower at dawn. Robin, spiraling into despair since Canton, resolves to destroy the tower and its contents and render its silver useless for future enchantment. Victoire escapes into hiding, and Robin and the remaining Babel scholars destroy the tower with them inside, crippling the Silver Industrial Revolution and leaving the future of the British Empire uncertain.

Characters
Robin Swift: The main character. His mother’s family were formerly merchants driven to poverty by his uncle’s opium addiction. Able to pass for white in certain lights, Robin feels conflicted by his desire to be accepted by Babel and his father, Professor Lovell, and his growing understanding that the system they perpetuate is indefensibly immoral.

Ramiz Rafi "Ramy" Mirza: A Muslim Indian student from Kolkata and Robin’s best friend and roommate.

Letitia “Letty” Price: The daughter of a British former admiral and Victoire’s roommate.

Victoire Desgraves: A Haitian student raised in France and Letty’s roommate.

Professor Richard Lovell: A professor of Chinese and committed imperialist. Cold and unyielding, he fathered both Griffin and Robin to create bilingual Chinese students for Babel.

Mrs. Piper: Lovell’s kindly housekeeper and a mother figure to Robin.

Griffin Harley: Robin’s half-brother by their shared father. Member of the Hermes Society. Similar in personality and mannerism to their father, Griffin is brutal and fully committed to bring the British Empire down by any means necessary.

Themes 

Language, translation, and the meaning and power of words are central themes in the novel. 

Diaspora and colonization also play a significant role, where three of the four main student characters are people of color and brought to England from British colonies. 

Additionally, the concepts of power, rebellion and revolution are explored within the novel, through the depiction of power dynamics between the elite and lower classes, racism and oppression, workers' rights and strikes, and Machiavellianism.

Reception

Reviews 
In the second week of September 2022, Babel debuted at the top spot on The New York Times Best Seller list for hardcover fiction.

Babel was generally well received by critics, including starred reviews from Booklist and Kirkus Reviews. Booklist called the novel "engaging" and "richly descriptive," while Kirkus said it’s "ambitious and powerful while displaying a deep love of language and literature." Kirkus further called it "an expansive, sympathetic, and nevertheless scathing critique of Western imperialism and how individuals are forced to make their peace with the system and survive or to fight back and face the consequences."

Amal El-Mohtar, writing for The New York Times Book Review wrote, "Babel derives its power from sustaining a contradiction, from trying to hold in your head both love and hatred for the charming thing that sustains itself by devouring you."

Many reviews discussed Kuang's attempt to complicate modern understandings of academia in the 1830s, including the research and footnotes she included throughout the novel. The Guardian said, "This is a scholarly book by a superb scholar," highlighting how "the pages are heavy with footnotes; not the more usual whimsical ones ... but academic notes, hectoring and preachy." They further noted how the characters "are pretentious, but vulnerable too, and the balance is lovely." Similarly, the Chicago Review of Books highlighted how Babel "educates and urges us to reframe—to (re)translate—the dominant narrative of what the West calls its civilization." They called the novel "brilliant both in concept and execution, ... a page-turner with footnotes, a thriller with a higher purpose, a Bildungsroman where the stakes matter." Library Journal echoed the sentiment, writing about how Kuang "prompts readers to question the ethics of both empire and academia." They continued, saying, "Kuang is a refreshing and essential voice in fiction, and her latest will have wide appeal." Paste noted that Babel is "a meticulously researched period piece, a primal scream from the traditionally unheard." However, they added, "its determination to make sure its (admittedly important) message is heard, means a significant chunk of this doorstopper’s 500+ pages feels didactic and lecture-y, rather than fully transformative." Publishers Weekly negatively reviewed the novel, saying, "Kuang underwhelms with a didactic, unsubtle take on dark academia and imperialism." They explained, "The narrative is frequently interrupted by lectures on why imperialism is bad, not trusting the reader or the plot itself enough to know that this message will be clear from the events as they unfold. Kuang assumes an audience that disagrees with her, and the result keeps readers who are already aware of the evils of racism and empire at arm’s length. The characters, meanwhile, often feel dubiously motivated."

Awards and honors 
Amazon, Kirkus Reviews, NPR, and The Washington Post named Babel: Or the Necessity of Violence one of the best fantasy books of the year. Barnes & Noble named it one of the top ten books of the year, regardless of genre.

References 

2022 novels
Novels set in the 1800s
Novels set in the 19th century
HarperCollins books
The New York Times Best Seller list
Books by R.F. Kuang